Cornea is Sywnthkrawft's first studio album, released in 2006. The album consists of rerecorded and rearranged songs from early recording sessions in 2005. The album have been described as "space romance" and "ambient movie score music". Followed by the release of the album they had a concert at Caoz in Borlänge, later released on the bootleg Caoz at Chaos.

Outtakes
Many of the songs on the album were inspired by some early recordings made in 2005 by the band. Some of the songs were not rearranged and not rerecorded for this album, these were:
 The Greeting (studio version was never released, but they've performed it live once with lyrics and vocals by William Johansson. Live version was released on Caoz at Chaos)
 Extermination (studio version was never released, but they've performed it live once with lyrics and vocals by William Johansson. Live version was released on Caoz at Chaos)
 Afrika (was rehearsed for the Chaos at Caoz concert but were never played. Never commercially released, circulating. The outtake contains lyrics and vocals by Daniel Thyberg and William Johansson)
 World Wide Train (never commercially released, not circulating)
 Paul Newman (later reworked for the upcoming album "Goodbye, Spaceblade", but as it seems now it won't be featured on that album either)

Also, alternate live versions from their concert at Caoz in Borlänge exists. They were released on the bootleg Caoz at Chaos. Most notably among these live recordings were.
 Das Pirat auf der Mondicht (is called Das Piraten auf der Mondicht on the bootleg, and the live version have lyrics and vocals by William Johansson)
 Grace from Space (This live version have lyrics and vocals by William Johansson and Daniel Thyberg)

Track listing
"Incoming über das Welt" (W.Johansson) - 01:39
"Approaching Atmosphere" (W.Johansson, D.Thyberg) - 03:38
"Night Flight" (W.Johansson, D.Thyberg) - 05:43
"Das Pirat auf der Mondicht" (W.Johansson) - 02:38
"Grace from Space" (W.Johansson, D.Thyberg) - 03:27
"Space" (D.Thyberg) - 02:24
"Making Adjustments" (W.Johansson, D.Thyberg) - 04:29
"Children" (W.Johansson, D.Thyberg) - 04:48
"S.A.Z.A." (W.Johansson, D.Thyberg) - 04:23
"Armageddon Apocalypse" (W.Johansson) - 02:29
"Restoring the Planet 2006" (W.Johansson) - 04:31

Singles
"Approaching Atmosphere" (21 September 2005)
"Making Adjustments" (2 August 2006)

Credits
William Johansson - Synthesizers
Viktor Jacobsson - Synthesizers
Gustav Jacobsson - Synthesizers
Daniel Thyberg - Synthesizers
Produced by Geoff Swartz and William Johansson
Recorded at William Production Studios, Borlänge
Mixed at William Production Studios, Borlänge
Mastered in Canton, Ohio, United States

References

2006 debut albums
Sywnthkrawft albums